An automatic tachycardia is a cardiac arrhythmia which involves an area of the heart generating an abnormally fast rhythm, sometimes also called enhanced automaticity. These tachycardias, or fast heart rhythms, differ from reentrant tachycardias (AVRT and AVNRT) in which there is an abnormal electrical pathway which gives rise to the pathology. Most automatic tachycardias are supraventricular tachycardias (SVT). It is important to recognise an automatic tachycardia because the treatment will be different to that for a reentrant tachycardia. The most useful clue will be the presence of 'warm up' and 'cool down'. This means that whereas a reentrant tachycardia will both begin and end abruptly as cardiac conduction utilises then ceases to utilise the accessory pathway, an automatic tachycardia will rise and fall gradually in rate as the automatic focus increases and decreases its automatic rate of electrical discharge.

Types
The different types are the following:
 Sinus tachycardia may be considered an automatic tachycardia, since the sinoatrial node (SAN) is discharging at an abnormally fast rate.
 Atrial ectopic tachycardia, in which the focus or foci are in the atria of the heart, is an automatic tachycardia.
 Atrial fibrillation may be considered an automatic tachycardia.
 Junctional ectopic tachycardia, in which the focus is in the atrioventricular node (AVN), and
 Accelerated idioventricular rhythm, involving a ventricular focus, are also examples. Idioventricular tachycardia is notable because it is the only automatic tachycardia which is not an SVT.

Treatment

Treatment depends on the origin of the automatic tachycardia, however the mainstay of treatment is either antidysrhythmic medication or cardiac pacing. Specifically overdrive pacing may be used for all forms of automatic tachycardia; a pacemaker assumes control of the heart rhythm in overdrive pacing. In some cases ablation of the ectopic focus may be necessary.

See also
 Cardiac ectopy
 Clinical cardiac electrophysiology
 Electrical conduction system of the heart
 Supraventricular tachycardia

References

Cardiac arrhythmia